Rathmines College is an educational institution in Rathmines, Dublin that offers various Further Education courses in areas such as accounting, business, computing, media studies, office administration etc. It has two campuses in Rathmines; in the former Rathmines Town Hall and at 28-9 Leinster Road. It operates under the patronage of the City of Dublin Education and Training Board (CDETB), known as the City of Dublin Vocational Education Committee (CDVEC) prior to 2013.

Rathmines College offers qualifications at levels 5 and 6 on Ireland's National Framework of Qualifications (NFQ). These courses are accredited by the Further Education and Training Awards Council ("FETAC"), Quality and Qualifications Ireland ("QQI") or by the Business and Technology Education Council ("BTEC").

Among its Accounting Programmes are the Accounting Technicians Ireland (ATI) Certificate, Diploma and Apprenticeship courses, the Association of Chartered Certified Accountants (ACCA) Certified Accounting Technician and the Advanced Diploma in Accounting and Business ACCA Award.

The college also offers a one-year repeat leaving certificate course.

See also
 Education in the Republic of Ireland
 List of further education colleges in the Republic of Ireland

References

External links
 Official website
 Profile on QualifaX, Ireland’s National Learners’ Database.

Education in Dublin (city)
Further education colleges in Dublin (city)
Further education colleges in the Republic of Ireland
Rathmines